Hothead Games Inc. is an independent Canadian video game developer based in Vancouver.

History 
The studio was founded in 2006 by Steve Bocska, Vlad Ceraldi and Joel DeYoung, all three of which were formerly employed by Radical Entertainment. However, Bocska left the company in 2007. On 10 March 2009, Ian Wilkinson, who had been president and chief executive officer of Radical Entertainment since its foundation in 1991 until 2008, became president and chief executive officer of Hothead Games, replacing Ceraldi. In turn, Ceraldi became the studio's director of game development, while DeYoung moved from his chief operating officer position to director of game technology.

Following the conclusion of the DeathSpank series and the departure of its creator Ron Gilbert in 2011, Hothead Games shifted its development focus entirely to mobile games in response to market trends surrounding mobile devices. In 2015, Hothead Games expanded by opening a studio in Halifax, Nova Scotia with an initial development team of 25 people, putting the company's employee count at 130. In 2019, Hothead Games established a publishing arm to promote third-party free-to-play titles.

On 14 October 2021, Embracer Group announced that its subsidiary DECA Games had acquired the Hothead Games titles Hero Hunters and Kill Shot Bravo. In January 2022, Vlad Ceraldi left Hothead Games to fill the CEO position of independent game developer Offworld Industries.

Games developed

References

External links 
 

2006 establishments in British Columbia
Companies based in Vancouver
Video game companies established in 2006
Video game companies of Canada
Video game development companies